Spies is part of the Private Snafu series of animated shorts produced by Warner Bros. during World War II. Released in 1943, the cartoon was directed by Chuck Jones and features the vocal talents of Mel Blanc. It was included as part of the International Spy Museum exhibits, specifically the exhibit showcasing World War II-era spying.

Plot

Private Snafu has learned a secret, but the enemy is listening and he'd better zipper his lip, and keep his brain secure with a padlock and chain. However, Snafu little by little lets his secret slip (by telling the audience, calling his mom, telling a magazine salesman, and drunkenly relaying it to a bar girl who works as a Nazi German spy, due to drinking an entire bottle instead of the glass he was given): His ship is about to set sail for Africa at 4:30. The information is picked up by spies and quickly relayed to Fuehrer Adolf Hitler, who orders the Nazis to attack the American fleet, which they do, shooting Snafu with torpedoes when he falls in the water after yelling for the ship to go "full speed ahead" to escape. He then ends up in Hell boiling in a cauldron, demanding to know who leaked the secret out. Adolf Hitler as well as Hitler's staff then appear as demons and reveal that he gave away the secret he was entrusted to keep, and then show him a mirror that reveals a horse's butt.

A scene in which Private Snafu becomes drunk is musically accompanied by an excerpt from Raymond Scott's composition, "Powerhouse".

References
 Friedwald, Will and Jerry Beck. The Warner Brothers Cartoons. Scarecrow Press Inc., Metuchen, N.J., 1981. .

External links

1943 films
1943 animated films
1943 short films
1940s spy films
Short films directed by Chuck Jones
Articles containing video clips
Private Snafu
Cultural depictions of Adolf Hitler
American World War II propaganda shorts
Films scored by Carl Stalling
Films produced by Leon Schlesinger
World War II spy films
American black-and-white films
1943 comedy films
1940s Warner Bros. animated short films